Sibinda is a settlement in Namibia. It is situated in the Zambezi Region 63 kilometres away from the region's capital, Katima Mulilo. In 2013, it was made the centre of the Sibinda Constituency by the former President of Namibia, Hifikepunye Pohamba.

Name 

The name Sibinda simply means 'Ungovernability' in the Lozi language (Silozi).

Politics 

In 2013, Sibinda was made the centre of the new Sibinda Constituency by the former President of Namibia, Hifikepunye Pohamba.

References

Populated places in the Zambezi Region